A winch is a mechanical device that is used to pull in (wind up) or let out (wind out) or otherwise adjust the tension of a rope or wire rope (also called "cable" or "wire cable").

In its simplest form, it consists of a spool (or drum) attached to a hand crank. Traditionally, winches on ships accumulated wire or rope on the drum; those that do not accumulate, and instead pass on the wire/rope (see yacht photo above), are called capstans. Despite this, sailboat capstans are most often referred to as winches.  Winches are the basis of such machines as tow trucks, steam shovels and elevators. More complex designs have gear assemblies and can be powered by electric, hydraulic, pneumatic or internal combustion drives. It might include a solenoid brake and/or a mechanical brake or ratchet and pawl which prevents it unwinding unless the pawl is retracted. The rope may be stored on the winch. When trimming a line on a sailboat, the crew member turns the winch handle with one hand, while tailing (pulling on the loose tail end) with the other to maintain tension on the turns. Some winches have a "stripper" or cleat to maintain tension. These are known as "self-tailing" winches.

History

The earliest literary reference to a winch can be found in the account of Herodotus of Halicarnassus on the Persian Wars (Histories 7.36), where he describes how wooden winches were used to tighten the cables for a pontoon bridge across the Hellespont in 480 BC. Winches may have been employed even earlier in Assyria. By the 4th century BC, winch and pulley hoists were regarded by Aristotle as common for architectural use (Mech. 18; 853b10-13).

The yacht Reliance, American defender of the 1903 America's Cup, was the first racing boat to be fitted with modern winches below decks. The Reliance's competitors relied on muscle power using topside mounted capstans and windlasses, which would soon be replaced in most applications by winches, including on fishing boats, where they are used to bring in the fishing nets.

Other applications

Vehicle recovery
The main feature that legally distinguishes a tow truck from a conventional truck in many jurisdictions is the presence of a winch, which is used to either extract disabled or immobilized vehicles, or to load them onto flatbed/tilt and load type tow trucks. These may be electrically or hydraulically powered from a power take-off, and is wound with a wire cable and equipped with a hook. Snatch blocks may be used to change direction or increase the pulling power and a variety of specialized hooks may be attached to the main hook, including hooks which attach to specific parts of the car. J-hooks, which look somewhat like blunt meat hooks are used to hook around axles. Mini-J hooks can be used if there is a tow loop provided, and R and T hooks are designed to hook into slots cut by the manufacturer in the underside of the frame on many cars. Axle straps may also be used, when there are few other places to attach.

Off-road vehicles
Off-road vehicles may be equipped with recovery tools such as winches on the front and back bumpers, normally dead-bolted to the frame of the vehicle. The snubbing winch is used to pull vehicles out of mud, snow, sand, rocks, and water, and to pull vehicles through or over obstacles. The winch is made of cable made up of a braided synthetic rope, or a steel cable wrapped around a motorized drum.  Each is controlled electronically, allowing the operator to control the winch speed.

Aircraft use

Gliders are often launched using a winch mounted on a trailer or heavy vehicle. This method is widely used at many European gliding clubs, as an inexpensive alternative to aerotowing. The engine is usually a gas/petrol, LPG or diesel, though hydraulic fluid engines and electrical motors are also used. The cable is released at a height of about  after a short, steep climb.

Search and Rescue helicopters are often equipped with winches to avoid having to get the helicopter dangerously close to obstacles, or into ocean troughs, allowing rescue teams to be lowered and evacuees to be extricated while the helicopter hovers overhead. Helicopter winches are also used for heli-logging and for airlifting oversized cargo, such as vehicles and other aircraft, although the winch in these cases is only used to reduce the hazards to flying with an loose cable hanging below the helicopter.

Stationary balloons, such as the barrage balloons used during the Second World War to discourage marauding aircraft, and the Kite balloons used during the First World War for artillery spotting are usually tethered with a winch, which can be used to lower the balloon, either to relocate it, or to bring it down quickly to prevent it being shot down by enemy aircraft. Larger man carrying kites often used winches to raise and lower them.

Towed gunnery targets, used to train anti-aircraft gunners, and both fighter pilots and aircraft gunners, are run out behind the target tug aircraft for practice, and winched in for take-off and landing.

Before advances were made in antennas in the 1950s, radio aerials were quite long, and needed to be winched out for use, and winched back in for landing. Failure to do so would then damage the aerial, as happened to Amelia Earhart on one of the legs of her last flight.

Theatre

Winches are frequently used as elements of backstage mechanics to move scenery in large theatrical productions. They are often embedded in the stage floor and used to move large set pieces on and off.

Wakeskate winch
Wakeskate winching is a sport where a person on a waterski or snowboard is propelled across the water with a winch. The winch consists of a gas-powered engine, spool, rope, frame, and sometimes a simple transmission. The person being towed walks (or swims) away from the winch, while extending the rope. The winch may be mounted to a vehicle, set into the ground by stakes, or tied to a tree. The cable may also be run through pulleys mounted offshore so that it pulls the person away from where the winch is located, and multiple pulleys may be used to multiply the force applied by a small but high revving motor instead of using a transmission.

Winch types

Lever winch
Lever winches are winches that use self-gripping jaws instead of spools to move rope or wire through the winch. Powered by moving a handle back and forth, they allow one person to move objects several tons in weight.

Snubbing winch
This is a vertical spool with a ratchet mechanism similar to a conventional winch, but with no crank handle or other form of drive. The line is wrapped around the spool and can be tightened or reeled in by pulling the tail line. The winch takes the load once the pull is stopped with little operator tension needed to hold it. These also allow controlled release of the tension by the operator using the friction of the line around the ratcheted spool. They are used on small sailing boats and dinghies to control sheets and other lines, and in larger applications to supplement and relieve tension on the primary winches.

Air winch

An air winch, sometimes known as an air hoist or air tugger, is an air-powered version of a winch. It is commonly used for the lifting and the suspension of materials. In the oil and gas, construction, and maritime industries, air winches are frequently preferred to electric, diesel, and hydraulic winches because of their durability, versatility, and safety.

See also

 Block and tackle
 Capstan equation
 Come-along
 Harness (disambiguation)
 Hoist (device)
 Hoist (mining)
 Parasailing
 Portsmouth Block Mills
 Pulley
 Steam donkey
 Wire rope spooling technology

References

External links

Mechanisms (engineering)
Sailing ship components